Martin Mauricio Gison (born 14 March 1914, date of death unknown) was a Filipino sports shooter. He is competed at five Olympic Games, the most for any Filipino as of 2008.

Gison's first Olympics was in 1936 at 22 years old. He also competed at the 1948, 1952, 1956 and 1964 editions of the Olympics. The best finished accomplished by Gison was in 1936 where he placed fourth in the men's 50m small-bore rifle event.

During World War II, Gison was taken as a prisoner of war by the Japanese and survived the Bataan Death March.

References

External links
 

1914 births
Year of death missing
Filipino male sport shooters
Olympic shooters of the Philippines
Shooters at the 1936 Summer Olympics
Shooters at the 1948 Summer Olympics
Shooters at the 1952 Summer Olympics
Shooters at the 1956 Summer Olympics
Shooters at the 1964 Summer Olympics
Asian Games medalists in shooting
Shooters at the 1954 Asian Games
Shooters at the 1958 Asian Games
Shooters at the 1962 Asian Games
Place of birth missing
Filipino military personnel of World War II
Medalists at the 1954 Asian Games
Medalists at the 1958 Asian Games
Asian Games gold medalists for the Philippines
Asian Games silver medalists for the Philippines
Asian Games bronze medalists for the Philippines
Philippine Sports Hall of Fame inductees
20th-century Filipino people